The Secretary is a 1995 American made-for-television thriller film directed by Andrew Lane with a script by Graham Flashner, featuring Mel Harris, Sheila Kelley and Barry Bostwick. The soundtrack was provided by Louis Febre.

References

External links
 

1995 films
1995 television films
1995 thriller films
1990s American films
1990s English-language films
American thriller television films
CBS network films
Films scored by Louis Febre